Lamkowo   is a village in the administrative district of Gmina Barczewo in Olsztyn County, Warmian-Masurian Voivodeship in northern Poland. It has a population of 100.

References

Lamkowo